Enannatum II , son of Entemena, was Ensi (governor) of Lagash. 

Only a few inscriptions of Enannatum II are known, suggesting a short reign. One of these inscriptions, of which four nearly identical instances are known, appears on a door socket from the great storehouse of Ningirsu at Lagash, which he restored:

 

He had a son named Lummadur, the last representative of the house of Ur-Nanshe, who apparently never held an official title. It seems that the power of Lagash waned at this point, and that other territories such as Umma ("Gishban") and Kish prevailed. 

Enannatum II was the last member of the family of Ur-Nanshe. He was succeeded by a priest named Enentarzi.

See also

References

Kings of Lagash
25th-century BC Sumerian kings